Orlando Allen (1803–1874) was a member of the New York State Assembly and the 18th mayor of the City of Buffalo, New York. Allen began his political career as city treasurer, followed by two separate terms as Second Ward Alderman. He served an extended single term as mayor after being appointed in January 1848. He was elected to a full term in March of that year, and served until the term expired in 1849, when he declined to run for a second term. He was a member of the State Assembly in 1850 and 1851. He later served on the Buffalo Board of Supervisors, representing the Second Ward in 1856–1857, before winning one final term in the State Assembly in 1860. He ran for most of his offices as a Whig, however, after the collapse of that party, he served his final term in the Assembly as a Republican.

References

External links
William Clement Bryant, "Orlando Allen. Glimpses of life in the village of Buffalo." (Buffalo, N.Y: Buffalo Historical Society, 1877)

1803 births
1874 deaths
New York (state) Whigs
19th-century American politicians
Mayors of Buffalo, New York
Members of the New York State Assembly
New York (state) Republicans